James Bagshaw may refer to:
 James Bagshaw (footballer, born 1885), English football defender
 James Bagshaw (footballer, born 1874), English football goalkeeper